Lovelady Independent School District is a public school district based in Lovelady, Texas (USA), located within Houston County.

The district has two campuses - Lovelady Junior High/High School (Grades 7-12) and Lovelady Elementary/Middle School (Grades PK-8).

In 2009, the school district was rated "recognized" by the Texas Education Agency.

The Texas Department of Criminal Justice J. Dale Wainwright Unit (previously Eastham Unit), which has employee housing, is located within the Lovelady district.

On April 13, 2014, there was minor damage at the High School after a tornado ripped through the town.

Lovelady ISD is one of the few districts in Texas that does not allow out of district transfers, with the exception of children of nonresident employees.

Consolidations
Lovelady consolidated with Pearson Chapel, Weldon, Cutt, Austonio, and Creek Schools, all during World War II except Austionio, which was in 1964.

References

External links

School districts in Houston County, Texas